Lakeside is an unincorporated community in Beaver Township, Pulaski County, in the U.S. state of Indiana.

History
A post office was established at Lakeside in 1885, and remained in operation until it was discontinued in 1906.

Geography

References

Unincorporated communities in Pulaski County, Indiana
Unincorporated communities in Indiana